Topi Olli Vihtori Raitanen (born 7 February 1996 in Tampere) is a Finnish runner specialising in the 3000 metres steeplechase. He is the current European Champion in the event. He also reached the final at the 2018 European Championships finishing eighth. Raitanen also runs for Finland in Orienteering and has won a gold medal at the Junior World Orienteering Championships.

He qualified to represent Finland at the 2020 Summer Olympics, placing eighth in the final.

International competitions

Personal bests
Outdoor
800 metres – 1:48.92 (Lappeenranta 2018)
1500 metres – 3:38.48 (Jyväskylä 2021)
3000 metres – 7:49.00 (Joensuu 2021)
3000 metres steeplechase – 8:16.57 (Monaco 2020)
5 kilometres – 13:43 (Armagh 2019)

Indoor
1500 metres – 3:49.63 (Helsinki 2018)
3000 metres – 7:55.71 (Glasgow 2019)

References

External links
 
 
 Topi Raitanen at World of O Runners
 
 

1996 births
Living people
Finnish male steeplechase runners
Sportspeople from Tampere
Competitors at the 2017 Summer Universiade
Athletes (track and field) at the 2020 Summer Olympics
Olympic athletes of Finland
20th-century Finnish people
21st-century Finnish people
European Athletics Championships winners
Junior World Orienteering Championships medalists